The prominent post of Bath City Architect and Surveyor was bestowed by the Corporation of Bath, Somerset, England, on an architect who would be repeatedly chosen for civic projects. The posts were often bestowed separately with surveyor being the first appointment. Surveyors such as Lowder never shared the title with that of City Architect.

 Thomas Warr Attwood (unofficially) –1775
 Thomas Baldwin 1776–1792
 John Palmer 1792–1817
 John Lowder 1817–1823
 George Phillips Manners 1823–1862

See also
 Bath City Architect

References

Bath City Surveyor
City Surveyor
1776 establishments in England
Surveyor